Schizothorax malacanthus is a species of ray-finned fish in the genus Schizothorax from the upper Irrawaddy River drainage in Yunnan. It is found in hill streams with rocky stream beds, it grazes on periphyton.

References 

Schizothorax
Fish described in 1985